Divine Madness may refer to:

 Divine madness, unconventional behavior often associated with certain types of spiritual practice
 Theia mania, unusual behavior attributed to intervention of a god in Plato's philosophy
 Divine Madness (Madness album), an album by the British band Madness
 Divine Madness (film), a 1980 Bette Midler concert film
 Divine Madness (Bette Midler album), the soundtrack album to that film
 Divine Madness (novel), the fifth book in the CHERUB series by Robert Muchamore
 The Divine Madness, an American band
 Wōdanaz, the chief Germanic deity